IPS Salinero (formerly Keltec Salinero and Gestion Salinero; 6 May 1994 – December 2022) was a horse ridden by the Dutch equestrian Anky van Grunsven in the sport of dressage.

Salinero was expected to be a jumper and was a full brother to Olympic show jumper Seven Up. When Sjef Janssen noticed the potential the horse had for dressage, he purchased him for American Tess Guilder. After the gelding did well at the lower levels, Sjef and his wife Anky purchased him for themselves.

Anky van Grunsven had achieved success with the gelding winning the individual gold medal at the 2004 and 2008 Olympic Games and numerous international Grands Prix. On Salinero, she won the title at Aachen in 2004, making her the first Dutch rider to win there.

As of late 2008, Salinero competed under the name "IPS Salinero," changed from the former Gestion Salinero and Keltec Salinero.

Salinero was very sensitive, and during the earliest stages of his Grand Prix career he could get tense. However, as he matured, the gelding became more relaxed, and his scores improved. After his rides, Salinero was rewarded with bananas.

At age 16 (2010), Salinero retired from the big shows. However, an injury to van Grunsven's IPS Upido caused her to bring Salinero back in her bid for the 2012 Olympics. Salinero's return to the big shows was at CDIO Saumur (26–29 April 2012), where the combination placed second.

On 24 June 2012, Salinero and Anky van Grunsven were officially added to the 2012 Dutch Olympic Dressage Team along with Adelide Cornelissen (Parzival) and Edward Gal (Undercover).
Van Grunsven and Salinero turned in a performance that helped to capture the team bronze medal for the Netherlands on 2 August 2012, despite the fact that Van Grunsven's husband and national team coach, Sjef Janssen, had gotten violently ill the previous night. Salinero's last ride came at the Olympic Individual Dressage Competition on 9 August 2012. The 18-year-old horse posted a score of 82.000%, which earned sixth place overall. An emotional van Grunsven refused to leave Salinero's side long after the event completed. Salinero retired to pasture at van Grunsven's residence in the Netherlands.

Salinero died in December 2022, at the age of 28.

Results
 2012 Olympic Games London (GBR) : GPSpecial 82.000%
 2012 Olympic Games London (GBR) : GPKür 73.343% (Team Bronze) 
 2008 Olympic Games Beijing (CHN) : GPKür 82.500% (Individual Gold)
 2006 WEG Aachen : GPKür 86.10% (1st place), GP 77.80% (2nd place)
 2006 CHIO Rotterdam: GP 81.33% (World Record)
 2006 CDI-W Final Amsterdam (NED): 78.250% (1st place)
 2006 CDI 3*-W 's-Hertogenbosch (NED)  GPKür 87.925% (world record), GP 77.375% (1st place)   
 2005 CDI-W Mechelen: (BEL)  GPKür 83.600%, GP 76.126% (1st place)
 2005 CDI-W London-Olympia (GBR): GPKür 82.850%, GP 76.083% (1st place)      
 2005 CDI 3*-W Maastricht (NED): GPKür 82.375%, GP 78.000% (1st place)  
 2005 CDIO 3* Aachen (GER): GPKür / CDIO 81.525%, GPSpecial / CDIO 70.960%, GP / CDIO 74.500%
 2005 CH-EU-D Hagen (GER): GPKür 83.000%, GPSpecial 76.160%, GP 77.417% (1st place)     
 2005 CDI 3* Gelderland (NED): GPSpecial 78.640%, GP 78.212% (1st place)    
 2005 CDI-W Final Las Vegas (USA): GPKür 86.725%, GP 78.000%  
 2005 CDI-W Düsseldorf (GER): GP 77.416%, GPKür 84.425% (1st place)       
 2005 CDI 3*-W 's-Hertogenbosch (NED):  GP 75.750%, GPKür 83.600% (1st place)       
 2004 Olympic Games Athens (GRE): GPKür 85.825%, GPSpecial 77.800%, GP 74.208% (Individual Gold)    
 2004 CDIO Aachen (GER): GPKür 83.650%, GPSpecial 77.160%, GP 75.416% (1st place)  
 2004 CDI-W Final Düsseldorf (GER): GP 75.791%, GPKür 83.450% (1st place)
 2004 CDI-W 's-Hertogenbosh (NED): GP 75.208%,  GPKür 81.400% (1st place)       
 2004 CDI-W Amsterdam (NED): GP 74.750%, GPKür 80.450% (1st place)  
 2003 CDI-W Mechelen (BEL): GP 72.125%, GPKür 80.825% (1st place)    
 2003 CDI-W Maastricht (NED): GP 70.083%, GPKür 79.975%

See also
 Bonfire (horse)
 Upido

References

External links
 Keltic Salinero in the WEG 2006

1994 animal births
2022 animal deaths
Dressage horses
Individual warmbloods
Horses in the Olympics